Lord Claud Nigel Hamilton  (10 November 1889 – 2 August 1975) was a British Army officer and courtier.

Family and education
The youngest son of James Hamilton, 2nd Duke of Abercorn, and Lady Mary Anna Curzon-Howe, he was educated at Wellington College, Berkshire.

On 11 July 1933 he married Violet Ruby Newall (née Ashton), mother of Pamela Newall (later Baroness Sharples). They had no children.

Career

Army
In 1907 Hamilton joined the 3rd Battalion (Lothian Regiment) of the Scots Guards as a Second Lieutenant, and transferred to the Grenadier Guards in 1909, having been promoted to the rank of Captain the previous year. During the First World War he was mentioned in despatches in 1914 for having "commanded a machine-gun for five days and nights without relief". The same year he was made a Companion of the Distinguished Service Order. In 1916 he was made an MVO, and in 1918 he became an Officer of the Order of the Crown of Italy and was awarded the Croix de Guerre.

Royal household
In 1919 he was employed as an equerry to Edward, Prince of Wales and made a CMG in 1920 for services to the Prince on his overseas visits.

In 1921 Hamilton was promoted as Deputy Master of the Household, made an Extra Equerry to King George V a year later and an Equerry in 1924. In 1932 he was promoted to a CVO, and to a GCVO in 1937. In 1936 he was one of the escorters of the gun carriage at the King's funeral and became Queen Mary's Comptroller, Treasurer and Extra Equerry that year. He served in these offices until her death in 1953, when he became an Extra Equerry to Elizabeth II until his own death in 1975 aged 85.

References

External links
 

Companions of the Order of St Michael and St George
Companions of the Distinguished Service Order
Scots Guards officers
Grenadier Guards officers
British Army personnel of World War I
Knights Grand Cross of the Royal Victorian Order
People educated at Wellington College, Berkshire
Younger sons of dukes
1889 births
1975 deaths